Faith Lake is a lake on Vancouver Island south east of headwaters of Ralph River.

References

Alberni Valley
Lakes of Vancouver Island
Comox Land District